McCormick Distilling Company is a distillery and alcoholic beverage importing company in Weston, Missouri. Established by Ben Holladay in 1856, the distillery has been registered in the National Register of Historic Places and is the oldest distillery west of the Mississippi River that is still operating at its original location.

History
The area for the distillery was chosen for the natural limestone springs that ran underground. After establishing the Holladay Distillery in 1856, Benjamin J. Holladay went on to great fame and fortune as the "Stagecoach King", running the stagecoach lines from Missouri to the West Coast that later became the Wells Fargo Express, and ultimately acquiring the Pony Express as well. He was a serial entrepreneur who owned saloons, hotels, and silver mines, and by 1864, he was the largest individual employer in the United States.  In 1860, Holladay turned the distillery over to his brother, Major David Holladay, who then ran the distillery until his death in 1894. His son-in-law, Thomas Barton, operated the distillery until it was sold to George Shawhan and became the Shawhan Distillery in 1900. During the period of Prohibition in the United States, the company remained open by bottling its previously distilled whisky for medicinal purposes. The distillery was sold to Isadore Singer in 1936, and was renamed as the Old Weston Distillery. Singer then purchased the McCormick brand name from a neighboring plant at Waldron, Missouri, and renamed the distillery McCormick Distilling Company in 1942. In 1950, the company was purchased by Cloud Cray of Midwest Grain Products.

Business partners Ed Pechar and Mike Griesser purchased the company in 1992. Under Pechar and Griesser's ownership and management, McCormick Distilling expanded from 35 employees in 1992 to 186 employees in 2006. Griesser died in November, 2004. As of 2020, McCormick Distilling remains a privately held corporation owned by company chairman Ed Pechar, the estate of Mike Griesser, and a small group of employee partners who comprise the board of directors.

Products
 

McCormick Vodka: According to the company, McCormick Vodka is the #2 selling American vodka in the world. McCormick Vodka is also available in a variety of flavors including Apple, Watermelon, Raspberry, Grape, Sweet Tea, Blueberry, Cherry, Citrus, Orange and Peach.
McCormick Gin
McCormick Old Style Whiskey
McCormick American Blended Whiskey
McCormick Caribbean Rum
McCormick Scotch
Platte Valley Corn Whiskey
Triple Crown Whiskey
Holladay White Dog
Ke-Ke Key Lime Cream Liqueur 
360 Vodka - the world's first "eco-friendly" vodka that offers a classic 80 proof and a variety of flavored expressions including 360 Lime, 360 Huckleberry, 360 Watermelon, 360 Mango, 360 Red Raspberry, 360 Pineapple, 360 Red Delicious Apple, 360 Madagascar Vanilla, 360 Grape, 360 Mandarin Orange, 360 Sorrento Lemon, 360 Bing Cherry, 360 Georgia Peach, 360 Double Chocolate, and 360 KC Barbeque.
Broker's Gin
Five Farms Irish Cream
McCormick Irish Cream 
Hussong's Tequila - Four different tequila products including: Reposado, Platinum, Silver, and Anejo
Tarantula Azul 
Tequila Rose Strawberry Flavored Cream Liqueur
Montego Bay Rum

Awards
360 Vodka has received awards for taste and innovation including the 2009 gold medal and 2008 bronze medal for best vodka at the San Francisco World Spirits Competition; a gold medal from the Beverage Testing institute (2010), gold medal from the Los Angeles Wine and Spirits competition (2009) and a platinum medal from the SIP awards (2010) for 360 Double Chocolate.

McCormick's Irish Cream won the 2003 gold medal at the San Francisco World Spirits Competition and was voted the #1 Irish cream beverage by the Beverage Testing Institute. 
Hussong's won the 2006 Gold medal at the San Francisco World Spirits Championship.

Green initiatives
In November 2007, the McCormick Distillery implemented a number of business practices that are asserted to be sustainable and environmentally friendly. An internal committee called the "Green Group" was established to improve environmental performance, increase operating efficiencies and energy savings, and heighten employee awareness and conservation. In the first year of the new green initiatives, 167 tons of material was recycled, with a participation rate of 88% among employees. To solidify the company's environmental commitment, McCormick Distilling partnered with the Environmental Protection Agency and Renewable Choice Energy.
Some of the environmental initiatives implemented at the distillery include:
On-site air pumps for car tires so that employees can maintain their vehicles' optimum fuel efficiency 
On-site recycling
Preferred parking spaces reserved for employees who drive hybrid and/or electric vehicles to work

360 Vodka
As part of the company's green initiative, 360 Vodka was marketed as "the Planet's first eco-friendly vodka". 360 Vodka is bottled using 85% recycled glass, 100% recycled paper and water-based UV inks. The grains used are grown less than 95 miles from the distillery to minimize the fossil-fuel consumption associated with transporting the grain. Consumers are allowed to return the bottle's swing-top closure to the company to be recycled, and for every top recycled, McCormick Distilling donates $1.00 to Global Green USA.

Forest 360
"Forest 360" is a campaign to reduce carbon dioxide emissions and greenhouse gasses that lead to global warming. With the assistance of the Missouri Department of Conservation, McCormick Distilling planted more than 200 indigenous trees on 40 acres of land surrounding the distillery and has invited business partners to do the same. Official participants of "Forest 360" include the Republic National Distributing Company, MGP ingredients, Hovey Williams I.P Law, J.B Thome and Co. Inc., Young's Market Company, Binder-Edelstein Company, Southern Wine and Spirits of Colorado, Fast Ireland Spirits.

Marketing
The company created and posted a series of cocktail how-to videos, distributed through social media networks like Facebook and YouTube.
In 2011, the 360 Vodka Virtual bartender application was launched to promote the concept of creating green cocktails.

Collectible decanters
McCormick Distilling has produced a series of decanters which are sought after by collectors. Produced between 1968 and 1987, at least 175 decanters were released in collections, the most popular of which were forty different decanters featuring Elvis Presley at every phase in his career.

Decanter series 
Automotive and Transportation
Bicentennial series
Birds
Bulls
Confederate series
Elvis series
Entertainer series
Frontiersman series
Great Americans series
Gunfighter series
Jugs
Lamp series
Pirate series
Shrine series
Sports and sports mascots
Warrior series
King Arthur series
 Miscellaneous.

1996 Export investigation

From 1996 to 1999, the company sold nearly five million gallons of disguised grain alcohol to a freight forwarder operated by a Russian immigrant for eventual smuggling into Russia. The shipper was suspected of having ties to some of the most powerful mob clans in Russia. Other distillers, brokers, and shippers around the United States were also reported to have been under investigation by U.S. authorities. McCormick was charged and pleaded guilty to a misdemeanor count of making a false entry in regulatory documents, in which it identified the alcohol as non-drinkable products such as industrial cleaning solutions (thereby evading tax duties), and it agreed to pay $2 million in penalties and $1 million in reparations paid to the government of Ukraine, and accepted a one-week suspension of its license.

See also

List of historic whisky distilleries

References

Footnotes
2000 to present; began international sales for McCormick portfolio in the Asia Pacific.

Endnotes

External links
Official web site
https://www.youtube.com/watch/v=c2v1nkqPQXo
https://www.youtube.com/watch?v=uV7nd489kCk
https://www.youtube.com/watch?v=XDCLnhZr0so
http://www.polarice.com/
http://www.vodka360.com/
http://www.wisers.ca/
http://www.mccormickdistilling.com/tartequila/#
http://www.tequilarose.com/

Distilleries in Missouri
Whiskies of the United States
Industrial buildings and structures on the National Register of Historic Places in Missouri
Food and drink companies established in 1856
Companies based in Missouri
Historic districts on the National Register of Historic Places in Missouri
National Register of Historic Places in Platte County, Missouri
Food and drink companies based in Missouri
American vodkas
Distilleries on the National Register of Historic Places